Grace Dove (born July 25, 1991) is an Indigenous actress and television host, early known for her role as  Hugh Glass' wife in the 2015 film The Revenant; as well as Ricki, a talented mechanic in the 2018 film How It Ends. Currently (2022) she stars alongside two-time Academy Awards winner Hilary Swank in the ABC network drama Alaska Daily, as journalists shining light on missing and murdered indigenous women and girls (MMIWG).

Early life
Dove was born on July 25, 1991, and is Secwepemc from the Canim Lake Indian Band in the Cariboo region of British Columbia. She was raised in Prince George, British Columbia, where she attended Salmon Valley Elementary School and Kelly Road Secondary School.  Her father was a filmmaker who took her on visits to Hollywood when she was a child.  After graduation from high school,  she moved to Vancouver to study acting at Vancouver Film School.

Career
At age ten, she landed a part as on-air correspondent  of the Prince George TV children's show Splatterday.  She has also worked as a co-host of the  reality action/adventure TV show UnderExposed, and appeared in the short film These Walls. (2012).  Dove  said she went on many auditions after acting school before she landed the part of Hugh Glass's unnamed Pawnee wife.  The Revenant'''s director Alejandro González Iñárritu did not audition her 'in the normal way' but "instead had some questions and a process that dug into who I was." she said. After she got the part, playing an emotionally demanding role opposite Leonardo DiCaprio,  she said  she  "had to go in there extremely open without any expectations. Just like the audition process and even the filming process, I didn't know what exactly I was getting into. I prepared myself physically, emotionally and spiritually to be as open as possible so I could take direction, feed off my surroundings, and feed off my relationship with Leonardo within the scene. Obviously it’s a period piece and so I was trying to connect to a layer of my ancestry as well."

In 2016, The New York Times'' mentioned her as one of the 'lesser known faces' of the entertainment industry, in whom the fashion industry has taken an interest to promote new fashion.

Filmography

Film

Television

References

External links
 

1991 births
Living people
First Nations actresses
Canadian film actresses
People from Prince George, British Columbia
Canadian television actresses
Actresses from British Columbia